Paul Hutchinson (born 20 February 1953) is an English former footballer who played as a full back in the Football League for Darlington.

Hutchinson was born in Eaglescliffe, County Durham. He began his football career as a junior with Darlington, and made his senior debut on 23 October 1971, as a substitute for Colin Sinclair in a 3–0 defeat away to Aldershot in the Fourth Division. He made nine more appearances, all in the league in 1972–73, before moving into non-league football with Billingham Town.

References

1953 births
Living people
People from Eaglescliffe
Footballers from County Durham
English footballers
Association football defenders
Darlington F.C. players
Billingham Town F.C. players
English Football League players